The Private Press is the second studio album by American hip hop producer DJ Shadow, released by MCA Records on June 4, 2002. It peaked at number 44 on the Billboard 200 chart.

Critical reception

At Metacritic, which assigns a weighted average score out of 100 to reviews from mainstream critics, the album received an average score of 81, based on 24 reviews, indicating "universal acclaim".

David Browne of Entertainment Weekly wrote, "When Shadow incorporates a bit of '80s synth-pop here or industrial grind there, he's like a conductor waving in new instrumentalists with the flick of his wrist." Pascal Wyse of The Guardian commented that "It is strange for someone who 'creates' so few of his own sounds to have such a distinctive voice, but Shadow finds little ghosts in other people's music and sets them free." Rob Sheffield of Rolling Stone called it "an album full of playful experiments."

Spin included the album on the "40 Best Albums of 2002" list.

Track listing

Personnel
Credits adapted from liner notes.

 DJ Shadow – production, arrangement, art direction
 Tim Young – mastering
 Keith Tamashiro – art direction
 B+ – photography

Charts

Year-end charts

References

External links
 
 

2002 albums
DJ Shadow albums
MCA Records albums